Luke Allen-Gale is a British actor who has had roles in the apocalyptic series Dominion and in the ITV television show Monroe.

Career
Born in Dorset, he trained at the Drama Centre London and made his acting debut in 2008 on Wallander alongside Kenneth Branagh. Between 2011 and 2012 he had a recurring role in the TV series Monroe as Daniel Springer. Allen-Gale also had a recurring role as William Whele in the series Dominion between 2014 and 2015.

He made his professional West End stage debut in 2014 as Nicky Lockridge in Richard Greenberg's The American Plan, which transferred to the St James Theatre in London from Theatre Royal, Bath.

Allen-Gale has had roles in a number of Short films between 2009 and 2011. In 2010 he provided the voice of Spiller in the UK adaptation of the animated film The Secret World of Arrietty. In 2016, Allen-Gale took had a lead role as Inspector Godfrey in The CW TV Movie Transylvania.

He has also done voice acting for the BBC Radio 4's series GF Newman's The Corrupted, and in the video games Quantum Break, Final Fantasy XIV, Ryse: Son of Rome and Forza Horizon 4.

Filmography

Film

Television

Video Games

References

External links

Living people
English male stage actors
English male television actors
English male film actors
Alumni of the Drama Centre London
People from Bridport
Year of birth missing (living people)